Alfred Noe  (born January 13, 1953 in Stripfing, Lower  Austria) is an Austrian professor of Romance studies at the University of Vienna.

Biography 
Noe studied Romance philology, philosophy and art history at the University of Vienna from 1971 to 1980. He obtained a first habilitation in Romance literatures in1988 and a second habilitation in comparative literature in 1996 at the University of Vienna. In 1998 he was appointed Associate professor at the department of Romance Languages at the University of Vienna. From 2000 to 2002 he was Head of the department of Romance Languages and Deputy head of the same department from 2009 to 2014 He is a translator of libretti for the Konzerthaus, Vienna, the Theater an der Wien and for the Salzburg Festival.

Areas of interest in research and teaching 
 History of books and library history of the Early Modern Period
 Social history of literature, mainly concerning the effects of literature on the reader's mentalities
 Editions of French and Italian literary works in historic German translations of the Early Modern Period
 The Italian libretto in the 17th and 18th centuries, with a particular regard to the establishing and translating of texts for critical editions of baroque music in Austria
 The dissemination of literary works in from the Romance language areas into German speaking countries, in particular the oeuvre of the Italian poets laureates at the Imperial court in Austria
 The transformative reception of literary traditions as a fundamental concept of the comparative literature in the Early Modern Period

Editorships and memberships 
 With Erika Kanduth and Alberto Martino founder of the series Wiener Beiträge zu Komparatistik und Romanistik  (Vienna Contributions to Comparative and Romance Studies) (Publisher: P. Lang, Frankfurt) 
 Co-editor of the book series Internationale Forschungen zur Allgemeinen und Vergleichenden Literaturwissenschaft  (Editions Rodopi, Amsterdam - Weidler Buchverlag, Berlin) and Translatio  (Weidler Buchverlag, Berlin) 
 2012-18 Editor of Editionen in der Kritik (Weidler Buchverlag, Berlin) 
 2003-12 Member of the Commission for Music Research of the Austrian Academy of Sciences; 
 Corresponding Member of the Accademia Galileiana in Padua (Italy)
 Member of the Scientific Advisory Board of the Giornale storico della letteratura italiana
 With Hans-Gert Roloff founder of the working group on the transformative reception of literary traditions in the Early Modern Period
 With Hans-Gert Roloff editor of the complete works by Johann Rist
 Director of research projects and editor of the complete dramatic works by Apostolo Zeno
 President of the Società Dante Alighieri, Vienna

Honors and awards 
 2012 Flaiano prize
 2011 Commendatore of the Order of Merit of the Italian Republic
 2002 Officer of the Ordre des Palmes académiques

Publications 
 Publication list of Alfred  Noe at the University of Vienna

Noe is the author of monographs, articles in scientific journals and editor of miscellanies on literary and didactic topics.

References

External links 
Alfred Noe, University of Vienna

1953 births
20th-century Austrian historians
University of Vienna alumni
Living people
21st-century Austrian historians
Academic staff of the University of Vienna